Hackney North and Stoke Newington is a constituency represented in the House of Commons of the United Kingdom since 1987 by Diane Abbott of the Labour Party, who served as Shadow Home Secretary from 6 October 2016 to 5 April 2020. Abbott was one of the first three Black British MPs elected, and the first female Black British MP in the UK.

Constituency profile
The constituency has always elected Labour MPs since its creation in 1950. While well connected to Central London, including the City of London, the seat generally has moderate incomes rather than high, and a narrow majority of wards had a relatively high ranking when placed in the Index of Multiple Deprivation, compiled in 2000. In line with most of Greater London since 2000 many parts, especially Stamford Hill, Upper Clapton, Lower Clapton have become marginal in terms of local councillors and these districts, with to a lesser extent the eponymous Hackney and Stoke Newington, are in the process of becoming re-gentrified with ongoing increases in land value, proximity to the London 2012 venues and a council that successfully reduced the level of crime by about 30% within a four-year period.  Demographically, almost 60% of households are singletons and households have a higher than average level of unemployment.

Through all these changes, under incumbent Diane Abbott, the seat has become a safe seat for Labour. Prior to her promotion to the Shadow Cabinet, Abbott for many years was Labour's regular commentator opposite Michael Portillo on the light-hearted political round-up series This Week, and continued to appear on the show periodically until its cancellation in 2019. On 23 February 2020, Abbott announced she would be returning to the backbenches upon the election of the new Labour leader on 4 April that year.

History
The seat was created in 1950 and has gone through many changes: in January 2006 the boundary moved again, this time to correspond with the local government ward boundaries.

Following major electoral reform at the Redistribution of Seats Act, 1885, part of the Third Reform Act, the seat of Hackney was divided into two and Hackney North was formed, this time to return only one Member of Parliament, commencing with the 1885 general election.

The Stoke Newington constituency was created at the 1918 general election by the division of the Hackney North constituency by the Representation of the People Act, 1918, known generally as Fourth Reform Act; an Act most importantly remembered for the first time extending suffrage to women. The constituency was identical in area to the Metropolitan Borough of Stoke Newington.

Following a decrease in the population the two constituencies were merged by the Representation of the People Act, 1948, retaining David Weitzman as MP and becoming the current constituency in the 1950 general election.

Political history

The seat's narrowest majority of 18.3% was in 1979 and its greatest, 62.4%, was in 2017. The 2015 result made the seat the 18th safest of Labour's 232 seats by percentage of majority and seventh safest in London.

In the 2016 referendum to leave the European Union, the constituency voted remain by 79.1%. This was the third highest support for remain for a constituency.

Boundaries 

1950–1955: The Metropolitan Borough of Hackney wards of Leaside, Maury, Southwold, Springfield, and Stamford, and the Metropolitan Borough of Stoke Newington.

1955–1974: The Metropolitan Borough of Hackney wards of Northfield, Northwold, Rectory, and Springfield, and the Metropolitan Borough of Stoke Newington.

1974–1983: The London Borough of Hackney wards of Brownswood, Clissold, Defoe, New River, Northfield, Northwold, and Springfield.

1983–2010: The London Borough of Hackney wards of Brownswood, Clissold, Eastdown, Leabridge, New River, North Defoe, Northfield, Northwold, Rectory, South Defoe, and Springfield.

2010–present: The London Borough of Hackney wards of Brownswood, Cazenove, Clissold, Dalston, Hackney Downs, Lea Bridge (apart from a small section at the southern end of the ward), Lordship, New River, Springfield, and Stoke Newington Central.

The constituency covers the northern part of the London Borough of Hackney.

The seat is bordered by the constituencies of Hackney South and Shoreditch, Islington North, Tottenham, and Walthamstow.

Members of Parliament

Election results

Elections in the 2010s

 

1: After the close of nominations, the Liberal Democrats suspended its support for Mathis's candidacy over tweets he made.

https://www.bbc.co.uk/news/politics/constituencies/E14000720

Elections in the 2000s

Elections in the 1990s

Elections in the 1980s

Elections in the 1970s

Elections in the 1960s

Elections in the 1950s

See also 
 List of parliamentary constituencies in Hackney
 List of parliamentary constituencies in London

Notes

References

External links 
Politics Resources (Election results from 1922 onwards)
Electoral Calculus (Election results from 1955 onwards)
 Diane Abbott's website

Parliamentary constituencies in the London Borough of Hackney
Parliamentary constituencies in London
Constituencies of the Parliament of the United Kingdom established in 1950
Stoke Newington